The Catholic Church in Sudan and South Sudan is composed of 
 one Latin hierarchy, united in one single episcopal conference, designated as Sudan Catholic Bishops’ Conference, comprising an ecclesiastical province under a Metropolitan Archdiocese per country, with a total of 7 suffragan dioceses.
 three Eastern Catholic transnational jurisdictions, each covering both countries (the Melkite one mainly in Egypt).

There is also an Apostolic nunciature to Sudan (papal diplomatic representation, embassy-level) in national capital Khartoum (into which to nunciature to Eritrea is also vested), and an Apostolic nunciature to South Sudan, but that last office in vested in the nunciature to Kenya (in Nairobi).

Current Latin dioceses

Ecclesiastical Province of Khartoum 
covering all Sudan

 Metropolitan Archdiocese of Khartoum
Diocese of El Obeid

Ecclesiastical Province of Juba 
covering all South Sudan

 Metropolitan Archdiocese of Juba
Diocese of Malakal
Diocese of Rumbek
Diocese of Tombura-Yambio
Diocese of Torit
Diocese of Wau
Diocese of Yei

Current Eastern Catholic jurisdictions 
Three rite-specific churches have competent diocesan jurisdictions, but none is proper to either country alone :

Armenian Church 
(Armenian rite in Armenian language)
 Armenian Catholic Eparchy of Iskanderiya (Alexandria), at Cairo, in and mainly for Egypt

Melkite (Greek) Catholic Church 
(Byzantine Rite)
 Melkite Catholic Patriarchal territory of Egypt, Sudan and South Sudan

Syriac Catholic Church 
(Antiochene rite in Syriac language)
 Syriac Catholic Patriarchal territory of Sudan and South Sudan

Defunct jurisdictions 
No titular see.

Only direct precursors of present sees, except for one suppressed bishopric in Sudan :
 Latin Diocese of Dongola

See also 
 Roman Catholicism in Sudan
 Roman Catholicism in South Sudan
 List of Catholic dioceses (structured view)

Sources and external links 
 GCatholic.org - data for all sections
 Eglise Soudan: The Dioceses and Ordinaries of Sudan
 Catholic-Hierarchy entry.

Sudan

Catholic dioceses
Catholic dioceses